Mensur Kurtiši (born 25 March 1986) is a Macedonian footballer who currently plays for First Vienna in the Austrian Regional League East. Kurtiši plays as a striker and was called up to the Macedonian national team in May 2010.

Club career
Kurtiši was born in the village of Hotlane near Kumanovo, but moved to Austria when he was 13.
He began his career with an Austrian club Rapid Wien. Between 2006 and 2008 he played in Parndorf 1919. In September 2008 he signed with the Austrian club SC Wiener Neustadt. In January he joined Al-Shabaab from Al-Tawon. He scored a hat-trick in his first game for Al-Shabab. Persepolis club from Iran signed him on the mid-season transfer window of the Iranian league.

On 15 July 2014, Kurtiši signed a 1-year contract with Brisbane Roar for the 2014–15 A-League season. On 15 January 2015, he was released by the Roar.
At the end of winter market, as a free agent he signed a six-month contract for the Italian Serie B legends of A.S. Varese. In January 2016, Kurtiši moved back to Austria to play for First Vienna.

International career
He made his senior debut for Macedonia in a May 2010 friendly match against Azerbaijan and has earned a total of 2 caps, scoring no goals. His second and final international was another friendly 4 days later against Romania.

Honours

Individual
 Best Player in Austrian Football First League: 2007–08

References

External links
 
 
 Profile at MacedonianFootball.com
 Brisbane Roar Sign Mensur Kurtiši 
 

1986 births
Living people
Sportspeople from Kumanovo
Albanian footballers from North Macedonia
Macedonian people of Austrian descent
Association football midfielders
Macedonian footballers
North Macedonia international footballers
SC Wiener Neustadt players
Al-Taawoun FC players
KF Shkëndija players
FC Tobol players
Brisbane Roar FC players
S.S.D. Varese Calcio players
Matera Calcio players
First Vienna FC players
2. Liga (Austria) players
Austrian Football Bundesliga players
Saudi Professional League players
Macedonian First Football League players
Kazakhstan Premier League players
A-League Men players
Serie B players
Serie C players
Austrian Regionalliga players
Austrian Landesliga players
Macedonian expatriate footballers
Expatriate footballers in Austria
Macedonian expatriate sportspeople in Austria
Expatriate footballers in Saudi Arabia
Macedonian expatriate sportspeople in Saudi Arabia
Expatriate footballers in Kazakhstan
Macedonian expatriate sportspeople in Kazakhstan
Expatriate soccer players in Australia
Macedonian expatriate sportspeople in Australia
Expatriate footballers in Italy
Macedonian expatriate sportspeople in Italy